West Virginia Route 180 is a north–south state highway located in northern West Virginia. The southern terminus of the route is at West Virginia Route 18 north of Middlebourne. The northern terminus is at West Virginia Route 2 southwest of New Martinsville.

History
WV 180 was formerly designated as Alternate WV 18.

Major intersections

References

180
Transportation in Tyler County, West Virginia
Transportation in Wetzel County, West Virginia